The 2023 Kehoe Cup is an inter-county hurling competition in the province of Leinster, played by five county teams. It is the second level of Leinster/Ulster hurling pre-season competitions, below the 2023 Walsh Cup.

Format
Each team plays the other teams in the competition once, earning 2 points for a win and 1 for a draw. The first-placed team wins the tournament.

Kehoe Cup

References

Kehoe Cup
Kehoe Cup